"The Madras Song" produced by the Murugappa Group is a tribute to the city of Madras and was launched in commemoration of its 375th year which was celebrated in August 2014 .

There was a sequel to this song by Opus G7 for The Hindu group called Madras Beats in 2016 launched on the eve of 377th birthday celebrations of the Madras Day.

The Storyline
The story is of a female protagonist, Ruchi Kumar who misses her flight back home and is stuck in Madras, with three days in hand she turns to social media to help her discover the city of Madras.

The song features actor/model Yasmin Ponnappa. as the protagonist Ruchi Kumar, apart from the umpteen other stars from different walks of life like Viswanathan Anand, Gautham Vasudev Menon, Sudha Raghunathan, Naresh Iyer, Aalap Raju, Haricharan, Priyadarshini Govind, RJ Balaji, “Crazy" Mohan and "Maadhu" Balaji.

The Team
Writer / Director: Vijay Prabakaran

Music Director: Vishal Chandrashekhar

Lyricist: Subu

Singer: Shakthisree Gopalan

Cinematographers: GVS Raju & Imran Ahmedh KR

Lead Actress: Yasmin Ponnappa

Executive Producer: Krishna Ramkumar

Associate Director: Swathi Raghuraaman

Assistant Directors: Meera.Karthik, Keerthi Raju

Production Assistant:RM Ramesh kumar

Camera Assistant: Baskar

Stylist: Yasmin Ponnappa

Post Production: Red Studio

Editor: Vijay Prabakaran

Colorist: Madan

Logo Design: Hakuhodo Percept, Chennai

Produced by The Murugappa Group

Radio Partner: 92.7 BigFM

References

External links
The Madras Song Official Video on Youtube

2014 singles
Tamil-language songs
Indian songs
2014 songs
Songs about India
Chennai
Murugappa Group